Shea Rose is a singer-songwriter, performing artist, and music curator based in Boston, Massachusetts. She explores soul, rock, and hip hop while congruently inspiring her community to use the power of music for social change.

Music career
Rose has been described by former Boston Globe music critic Steve Morse as “that rare artist who can bridge diverse styles such as soul, funk, rock, rap and jazz -- and bring her unique stamp to each.” She has been labeled the “artist most likely to make an impact on the national stage” by the Boston Globe. In addition to her independent releases, Rose is a featured songwriter and performer on two Grammy award-winning jazz albums, “The Mosaic Project” (2011) and Money Jungle: Provocative in Blue (2012), both produced by legendary drummer Terri Lyne Carrington and featuring an all-star cast of musicians including Esperanza Spalding, Patrice Rushen, and the incomparable Herbie Hancock. Rose received a SESAC National Performance Activity Award for her collaboration on “The Mosaic Project”.

Rose has shared the stage with Gladys Knight, Macy Gray, Nneka, Alice Smith, and Talib Kweli, and she has performed internationally in Bucharest, Romania, Athens, Greece, Naples, Italy, St. Michaels, Barbados, Santiago/Havana, Cuba and Kingston, Jamaica.

Rose graduated from Berklee College of Music in 2011 and has received numerous awards and honors since, including multiple Boston Music Awards and a scholarship from the Songwriters Hall of Fame for “excellence in songwriting.”

D.T.M.A. (Dance This Mess Around) - 2017 
In 2017, Rose released the D.T.M.A. (Dance This Mess Around) EP. Rose recorded and produced the album independently with funding from a Kickstarter before being offered a contract by Virgin Records, and before turning it down. The album, which was released one track at a time with accompanying artwork and behind-the-scenes interviews, follows Rose's personal and creative evolution during this journey. The songs describe a struggle with the conformity that often accompanies mainstream success and a desire for freedom and self-expression. She’s Got Her Ticket describes Rose's transition “from the tough star with her eyes on success, to a stripped-down confident woman who has found herself.”

The accompanying D.T.M.A. interviews reveal the process as art, displaying not only the final, polished work, but the challenges and effort that went into making it. Both beautiful and painful at times, the process and Rose's personal experiences while creating this project became as important as the album itself and are now inseparable from the music.

"Black Boys On Mopeds" - 2016 
In the summer of 2016, Rose released a cover of Sinéad O’Connor’s “Black Boys On Mopeds,” available on iTunes, Spotify, and Bandcamp. Though the lyrics reference England in the 1990s, Rose felt that the song served as a universal statement on the social and political climate of the world in 2016. The song came to mind after the shooting and unrest in Ferguson. As more and more stories of police brutality came out, Rose was hesitant to release her recording, fearing it could be taken the wrong way. As the song goes, “To say what you feel is to dig your own grave.” But following the shootings of Alton Sterling and Philando Castile, and with a Presidential election coming that year, Rose chose to use her platform to spark a conversation about the disquieting conditions across the world.

Together with producer Simone Scazzocchio, Rose presented this song not as a musical performance, but as a conversation with the community. This conversation took place through social media on both Facebook Live and a Twitter live chat, as well as in person at community meetings and listening parties.

Little Warrior - 2011 
“Little Warrior” is not only the title of her album, but a moniker that Shea Rose embodies physically and artistically. Rose expresses the “Little Warrior” on stage, through her music and fashion sense, and in her daily life with her music for social change initiatives and outreach. She describes a “Little Warrior” as:Little Warrior: (noun) An Empowered, Independent, Tenacious, and Resilient Woman; A Citizen of the World, Zealous in nature, who uses Amity and Strength as her weapons of choice when presented with any battle.Rose believes we all have the power to face our battles with faith, strength and courage, embracing our inner warrior.

In the summer of 2015, Rose launched her “Warrior Wednesday” campaign, where she interviewed several "Warrior Women" in the Boston area to share their words of wisdom to other young women. Featured guests included Boston City Councilor Ayanna Pressley and Editor and Chief of Boston Common Magazine Lisa Pierpont. One video was shared every Wednesday on Rose's YouTube and social media pages.

Rock 'n Rose - 2010 
Rock ‘n Rose, Shea Rose's first EP (2010), was an introduction to her genre-blending style. At that time, Rose was known for her soulful rap-meets-rock sound, a big Afro, and killer heels. Her image was a fearless rapper with a rock-edge, but that was only one side of her. Rose's image has evolved greatly since this EP, as revealed through her more recent releases.

Community Outreach 
Off stage, Rose is dedicated to working with local and national communities to promote music for social change. Her outreach includes volunteering, live and in-studio performances, coaching, workshops, lectures, and clinics. She has worked with over 30 community organizations and served as an AmeriCorps State and National program volunteer for two years. Rose is the recipient of the Berklee College of Music, Walter W. Harp Liberal Arts Music and Society Award for her demonstration of outstanding achievement in research, civic engagement, and performance relating to music and society. She’s an “Artist for the Amazon,” representing the Amazon Aid Foundation, and co-wrote their call-to-action song, “Anthem for the Amazon,” to raise awareness about the environmental issues in the rainforest. She is also an artist representative for Music2Life, a non-profit foundation started by Noel Paul Stookey of Peter, Paul and Mary, and partners with the Safer is S.E.X.Y. campaign, spreading HIV awareness amongst teenage girls in underserved communities.

Fashion 
Rose was named one of the “Most Stylish Bostonians,” gracing the cover of Boston Globe magazine’s annual style issue, and has also appeared on the covers of Improper Bostonian, Exhale and Performer magazines. She’s been featured in brand campaigns for CoverGirl, Tory Burch, Puma, Plndr and Converse, and she made her international television debut hosting the “Boston Contemporary” episode of CNN’s travel and lifestyle show, “CNNGo.”

TEDx Talk 
Rose was chosen as a speaker for TEDx Beacon Street in the fall of 2014. Her talk, entitled “Somebody Stole My Voice Again,” addressed her experience following vocal surgery to remove a polyp:The voice has been described as the “muscle of the soul”. Then why do most of us cringe at the sound of hearing our own voice? Through personal stories and singing, Shea Rose, a two-time Boston Music Award winner and Berklee College of Music graduate, shares what she discovered about the human voice, after a major surgery on her vocal cords.The full talk is available to view on YouTube.

Isabella Stewart Gardner Museum RISE Series 
Currently, Rose is curating the RISE Music Series at the Isabella Stewart Gardner Museum in Boston with Composer/Producer Simone Scazzocchio. RISE features local, national, and international aspiring and established artists from the realms of pop, rock, and hip-hop. Since September 2015, Rose and Scazzocchio have brought artists including KING, Yuna, Will Dailey, and Goapele to the museum’s performance space and sonic cube, Calderwood Hall.

Awards and nominations
 2016: Boston Music Awards Nominee, R&B Artist of the Year
 2015: Boston Music Awards Nominee, R&B Artist of the Year, Pop Artist of the Year
 2014: Boston Music Awards Nominee, Pop/R&B Artist of the Year
 2013: Boston Music Awards Nominee, Female Vocalist Of The Year
 2012: Boston Music Awards Winner, Artist of the Year, Pop/R&B
 2012: SESAC Award for collaboration on Grammy Winning Jazz Album, "The Mosaic Project"
 2012: Songwriters Hall of Fame Abe Olman Scholarship Award recipient for ‘Excellence in Songwriting’
 2012: Red Bull Soundstage/Universal Music Group featured artist and fan-driven contest winner, featured at SXSW
 2011: Boston Music Awards Winner, Artist of the Year, R&B/Soul/Urban Contemporary
 2010: Chosen by Queen Latifah as spokesmodel for CoverGirl Ignite Your Persona campaign

Discography

Independent Releases 
 2017 D.T.M.A. (Dance This Mess Around) (EP)
 2016 "Black Boys On Mopeds" (single)
 2011 Little Warrior (mixtape)
 2010 Rock 'n Rose (EP)

Collaborations 
 Terri Lyne Carrington - Money Jungle: Provocative in Blue (Concord Jazz, 2013) Grammy Winner
 Terri Lyne Carrington - The Mosaic Project (Concord Jazz, 2011) Grammy Winner

References

External links
 
 Facebook
 Twitter
 Instagram
 YouTube
 RISE featured in the Boston Globe
 NECN video interview on RISE
 Dig Boston review of D.T.M.A.
 NPR Radio Boston interview
 MetroWest Daily News review
 Time Out Boston Review
 The Noise review
 Boldfacers.com

American women singer-songwriters
Living people
21st-century American singers
Year of birth missing (living people)
Musicians from Boston
Berklee College of Music alumni
21st-century American women singers
Singer-songwriters from Massachusetts